

Singles

1980s

1990s

2000s

2010s

See also
 Luis Miguel albums discography

Notes

References

 
Latin pop music discographies
Discographies of Mexican artists